Agnijal is a Bengali period romantic drama that was premiered on November 21, 2016, and aired on Star Jalsha. It was produced by Shree Venkatesh Films. It starred Rohit Samanta and Tumpa Ghosh in lead roles and Sudip Mukherjee as antagonist.

Plot 
Set in medieval India, it is about lust for power, conspiracies, battles and the magical love story of Prince Debdakhya and Souraja, a devadasi. Agnijal is a story of Sahashra Nagari, where a king Dev Daksha falls in love with a Devdasi named Souraja. But the Acharya of the temple Dhiratna opposes their love. Dev Daksha is the prince of Sahashra Nagari and son of King Dev Varma and queen Bedantika. Dev Daksha has two younger brothers and two younger sisters. Among them Gangeyo is the best friend of Dev Daksha. But Gangeyo's Mother, second wife of King Dev Varma, Tamakshi didn't like Dev Daksha and always wanted Gangeyo would be the future king of Sahashra Nagari. But after the accidental death of Dev Varma, Dev Daksha became the king and fell in love with the Devdasi of Lalataksha temple, Souraja. Souraja's Mother Kalabati always kept Souraja away from Acharya Dhiratna as she doesn't want that her daughter will also be a Devdasi like her. But clever Dhiratna find Souraja and announces that Souraja will be the next Devdasi of the temple. Finally one day Dev Daksha marries Souraja to protect her from the hands of Dhiratna.

Cast
 Payel De / Adrija Roy as Ma Singhobahini
 Rohit Samanta as Raja Dev Daksha 
 Tumpa Ghosh as Devdasi Souroja / Rani Sourojini
 Sudip Mukherjee as Acharya Dhiratna 
 Rudrajit Mukherjee as Gangeyo
 Bimol Roy as Old Gangeyo
 Diya Mukherjee as Sambhaba
 Rita Dutta Chakraborty as Rani Vedantika 
 Rajat Ganguly as Raja Dev Varma 
 Tulika Basu as Rani Tamakshi 
 Namita Chakraborty as Vedantika's Well wisher 
 Sohini Sanyal as Devdasi Kalabati
 Pushpita Mukherjee as Dhaima 
 Ranjini Chattopadhyay as Vedantika's Well wisher 
 Manishankar Banerjee as Tamonash 
 Priyanka Bhattacharjee as Atreyi 
 Samriddho as Abhigyan 
 Chaitali Chakraborty as Tamakshi's Well wisher 
 Sushmita Dey as Tamakshi's Well wisher 
 Sahana Sen as Shubhangi
 Rupsha Ghuha as Karali
 Payel Roy as Kuokini 
 Sairity Banerjee as Jaadukori
 Deetya Das as Sarbamangala

References

External links 
 Agnijal on Disney+ Hotstar

2016 Indian television series debuts
2017 Indian television series endings
Star Jalsha original programming